Eynsham  is an English village and civil parish in Oxfordshire, about  north-west of Oxford and east of Witney. The 2011 Census recorded a parish population of 4,648. It was estimated at 5,087 in 2020.

History

Eynsham grew up near the historically important ford of Swinford on the River Thames flood plain. Excavations have shown that the site was used in the Bronze Age (3000–300 BCE) for a rectilinear enclosure edging a gravel terrace. The Anglo-Saxon Chronicle records Eynsham as Egonesham and describes it as one of four towns that the Saxons captured from the Britons in 571 CE. Evidence has been found of 6th–7th-century Saxon buildings at New Wintles Farm, about three-quarters of a mile (1 km) from the present parish church. There is evidence that Eynsham had an early minster, probably founded in the 7th or 8th centuries. The name appears in 864 CE as Egenes homme: "Ægen's enclosure or river-meadow".

In 1005 Aethelmar, kinsman of Aethelred II founded a Benedictine abbey on the site of the earlier minster. The first abbot was Ælfric of Eynsham, a prolific writer in Old English. The Domesday Book of 1086 includes a paragraph on the settlement, then known as Eglesham.  By 1302 Eynsham had a wharf handling cargo that included hay, straw, malt, grain and timber, beside the later Talbot Inn on Wharf Stream, a tributary of the Thames. By the medieval period Eynsham Abbey was among the largest in the area. It succumbed to the Reformation in 1538 and few remains can be seen today. After the dissolution, its estates were granted to Sir George Darcy.

By 1790 a newly completed Oxford Canal was trading with Eynsham Wharf, mainly to sell coal from the Midlands. From 1792 the Oxford Canal employed a wharfinger at Eynsham and in 1800 bought the lease of the wharf. It consolidated its position by buying the Talbot Inn in 1845 and the freehold of Eynsham Wharf in 1849, perhaps in response to the railway mania that was taking traffic from canals and navigations. Eynsham Lock, on the Thames just above the confluence with Wharf Stream, was the last flash lock on the Thames, not rebuilt as a pound lock until 1928. The village suffered several fires in its history. Among the worst were a Whit Monday morning one in 1629, which destroyed 12 houses and another in 1681 that destroyed 20. By the early 19th century the parish had its own fire engine in a parish fire station on the ground floor of the early 18th-century Bartholomew Room, where it remained up to 1949.

The Bartholomew Room was built in 1703 from an endowment of John Liam Bartholomew in 1701 to found a parish charity school. Its lower storey was arcaded, presumably as market premises, but the arcades were walled up in the later 19th century. While some parts of the ground floor continued to serve as the fire station; others were turned into a village gaol. From 1928, a local Roman Catholic congregation used the upper room for its services. In 1983 the parish council bought and restored the building.

Roads

By the mid-18th century, Swinford had a ferry, but the main road was in poor condition. Heavier road traffic between Oxford and Witney preferred to pass further north via Bladon, where the better-maintained Oxford–Woodstock and Witney–Woodstock roads met. When the latter became a turnpike in 1751, the road via Eynsham and Swinford ferry was included as a branch. In 1769 the Earl of Abingdon opened Swinford Toll Bridge to replace the ferry. The Witney–Woodstock road ceased to be a turnpike in 1869, but the Witney–Oxford road remained one until 1877. Eynsham was a major coaching stop on the London–Fishguard road. Since 1922 this has been numbered as the A40. There is a planned expansion of the A40 between Eynsham and Witney into a dual carriage way, with work expected to commence in 2023 should planning permission be granted. In 1936 a bypass for the main road was built north of the village and the road over Swinford bridge renumbered as B4044.

Rail
The Witney Railway between Witney and Yarnton opened through Eynsham parish in 1861. The station was on the south side of the village. The Great Western Railway took over the line in 1890 and enlarged Eynsham station in 1944. British Railways closed the line to passenger trains in 1962 and in 1970 to goods traffic. The track was dismantled. The station has since been demolished and a business park built there. In February 2015 the Witney Oxford Transport Group proposed reopening the station as an alternative to improving the A40 road as proposed by Oxfordshire County Council. The case centred on the severe traffic congestion on the roads to and from Oxford.

Industry
Local industries include gravel extraction and a factory for superconducting magnets, Siemens Magnet Technology Ltd.

Churches

Church of England
The Church of England parish church, St Leonard's, was built the 13th century. In the 15th, the nave was rebuilt, a clerestory and north aisle were added and a west tower was built. There are Mass dials on the south wall. The building was restored three times: by William Wilkinson in 1856, Harry Drinkwater in 1892 and over eight years in the 1980s.  The west tower has a ring of six bells. James Keene of Woodstock cast the third in 1653. Richard Keene cast the fifth in 1673. John Taylor & Co of Loughborough cast or recast the treble, second, fourth and tenor bells in 1895. The church also has a Sanctus bell that Mears and Stainbank of the Whitechapel Bell Foundry cast in 1924.  St Leonard's is a Grade II* listed building.

Baptist
The Baptist church in Lombard Street was opened in either 1808 or 1818.

Roman Catholic
In 1895 Herbert May founded a Roman Catholic mission at his home, Newland Lodge. The lodge burnt down in 1897, after which Mass was said at the Railway Inn until May had a new house built for him. The mission closed when May moved to Oxford. In 1928 the Roman Catholic parish of Witney leased the upper storey of the Bartholomew Room, making it St Peter's Chapel. Building of a new Roman Catholic church began in the 1930s but was delayed by the Second World War and completed only in 1967.

Amenities
Eynsham Primary School is a community primary school. Eynsham's Bartholomew School is the county secondary school for the district. As a specialist technology college, it draws pupils mainly from primaries at Eynsham, Standlake, Stanton Harcourt, Freeland, Cassington and Hanborough.

Eynsham Football Club plays in the Oxfordshire Senior League Division One. Eynsham Sports and Social Club plays in Witney and District Football League Division Three and its reserve team in Division Four. Eynsham Cricket Club plays in Oxfordshire Cricket Association League Division Three.

Eynsham has a Women's Institute and a Morris dancing troupe.

Notable residents
In order of birth:
Dida of Eynsham (late 7th century), a Mercian noble
Ælfric of Eynsham (c. 955 – c. 1010), a monk, abbot and religious writer
Adam of Eynsham (early 13th century), a monk, abbot and writer
Anthony Kitchin (1471–1563) became Abbot of Eynsham, then Bishop of Llandaff.
Thomas Jordan (c. 1612–1685), child actor and poet, may have been born in Eynsham, where his family had land.
John Deval (1710–1774), Master Mason to the King
E. K. Chambers (1866–1954), Shakespeare scholar and local historian, retired to Eynsham and died there.
Eric Gordon (1905–1992), Bishop of Sodor and Man, retired to Eynsham and died there.
Mollie Harris (1913–1995), actress and author, lived in Eynsham and wrote a book about it: From Acre End, 1982.
Tommy Vance (1940–2005) was a BBC Radio 1 and Virgin Radio disc jockey born in Eynsham.
Anthony J. Batten (born 1940), Canadian visual artist, was born at Eynsham Hall.

See also
Crossings of the River Thames
Locks on the River Thames
Tilgarsley

References

Bibliography

External links

Eynsham Online

Civil parishes in Oxfordshire
Villages in Oxfordshire
West Oxfordshire District